List by constituency of the 577 deputies of the 13th French National Assembly (2007–2012) elected in 2007.

List of deputies by departments

13th
13th